Colin Lewis Rattray  (28 December 1931 – 19 February 2009) was an Australian politician. He was an Independent member of the Tasmanian Legislative Council from 1992 to 2004, representing first South Esk and then Apsley.

Rattray was born in Scottsdale, and was elected Mayor of Ringarooma in 1981. In 1992 he was elected to the Legislative Council for South Esk, which he held until that seat was replaced by Apsley in 1999. He remained member for Apsley until 2004, when he retired; he was succeeded by his daughter, Tania Rattray.

Rattray died in February 2009, aged 77.

References

1931 births
2009 deaths
Members of the Tasmanian Legislative Council
Independent members of the Parliament of Tasmania
Mayors of places in Tasmania
Recipients of the Medal of the Order of Australia
20th-century Australian politicians
21st-century Australian politicians